The 1971 Buckeye Tennis Championships, als known as the Buckeye Open, was a men's tennis tournament played on outdoor hard courts at the Buckeye Boys Ranch in Grove City, Columbus, Ohio in the United States that was part of Group D of the 1971 Grand Prix circuit. It was the second edition of the tournament and was held  from July 26 through August 1, 1971. Second-seeded Tom Gorman won the singles title and earned $5,000 first-prize money as well as 15 ranking points.

Finals

Singles
 Tom Gorman defeated  Jimmy Connors 6–7, 7–6, 4–6, 7–6(5–2), 6–3
 It was Gorman's first singles title of his career.

Doubles
 Jim Osborne /  Jim McManus defeated  Jimmy Connors /  Roscoe Tanner 4–6, 7–5, 6–2

References

Buckeye Open
Buckeye Open
Buckeye Open
Buckeye Tennis Championships
Buckeye Tennis Championships